Gerardo Concepción Pérez (born February 29, 1992) is a Cuban former professional baseball pitcher. After competing in the 2010–11 Cuban National Series, winning the Rookie of the Year Award, he defected to Mexico in order to become an MLB free agent. He pitched in MLB for the Chicago Cubs in 2016.

Professional career

Cuba
Concepción debuted in the Cuban National Series with the 2010–11 Industriales. In his rookie season, Concepción finished with a 10–3 win–loss record and a 3.36 earned run average (ERA) in 21 games pitched, including 16 games started. He placed among the league leaders in wins (finishing tied for sixth with Yosvani Torres), winning percentage (finishing second, behind Norberto González) and ERA (finishing ninth, between Miguel Alfredo González and Dalier Hinojosa). For his debut season, he was named the Cuban National Series Rookie of the Year.

Concepción defected from Cuba while in Rotterdam, Netherlands, where the Cuban national baseball team was participating in the World Port Tournament in June 2011, the same tournament where Aroldis Chapman defected from Cuba in 2009. Concepción established residency in Mexico and Major League Baseball declared him a free agent in January 2012.

Minor leagues
Concepción agreed to sign with the Chicago Cubs in February 2012, pending a physical. The deal, worth $6 million over five years, became official on March 11, 2012. The Cubs outrighted Concepción to the Kane County Cougars of the Class A Midwest League after the 2012 season. The Cubs assigned Concepción to the Arizona Fall League following the 2014 season. He began the 2015 season with the Myrtle Beach Pelicans of the Class A-Advanced Carolina League. He began the 2016 season with the Tennessee Smokies of the Class AA Southern League, and was promoted to the Iowa Cubs of the Class AAA Pacific Coast League.

Chicago Cubs
Concepción was promoted to the Cubs on June 21, 2016. He struck out the first batter he faced in his major league debut that night. He made three appearances in 2016 with a 3.86 ERA. The Cubs eventually won the 2016 World Series, ending their 108-year drought. Concepción was not present during the playoffs, but was still on the 40-man roster at the time and won his first World Series title. The Cubs non-tendered Concepción after the season. He was released on May 6, 2017.

Scouting report
He threw a fastball, which registered in the low 90s (miles per hour), and he also featured a curveball and a change-up. In his pitching motion, he threw across his body, which created deception in his delivery, but would prevent him from being consistent.

See also

List of baseball players who defected from Cuba

References

External links

 

Living people
1992 births
People from Havana
Major League Baseball players from Cuba
Cuban expatriate baseball players in the United States
Defecting Cuban baseball players
Major League Baseball pitchers
Chicago Cubs players
Peoria Chiefs players
Arizona League Cubs players
Kane County Cougars players
Daytona Cubs players
Industriales de La Habana players
Mesa Solar Sox players
Myrtle Beach Pelicans players
Tennessee Smokies players
Iowa Cubs players
Navegantes del Magallanes players
Cuban expatriate baseball players in Venezuela
Cañeros de Los Mochis players